Johanna Larsson and Jasmin Wöhr were the defending champions, but they lost in the second round to second seeded Anastasia Rodionova and Arina Rodionova.
Kimiko Date-Krumm and Rika Fujiwara won the title after defeating Sofia Arvidsson and Kaia Kanepi 6–2, 4–6, [10–5] in the final.

Seeds

Draw

Draw

References
 Main Draw

e-Boks Open - Doubles